Kokyo Gaien National Garden (or Kōkyogaien 皇居外苑) is located in Chiyoda, Tokyo, just  south of the Tokyo Imperial Palace.

Area

Kokyo Gaien National Garden has an area of about 450,000m2. When including Kitanomaru Park and one of the regions that make up Tokyo Imperial Palace, the area reaches 1,150,000m2.

Overview
Although it is a park, it has no playground equipment, and it is often seen as a place to relax and enjoy the history of Edo Castle and walk around the square. Also, due to the fact that it is adjacent to the Imperial Palace, there is surveillance by the Imperial Palace Police and the Tokyo Metropolitan Police Department.

Facilities and attractions
 Square in front of the Imperial Palace — A very large open space despite being in the center of the city
 Seimon Tetsubashi — The bridge used to have a two-tiered structure
 Sakurada Gate — It is designated as Important Cultural Property
 Sakashita Gate — Currently used as a gate for the Imperial Household Agency
 Kikyo Gate — The headquarters of the Imperial Police are located inside the gate
 Statue of Kusunoki Masashige
 Wadakura Fountain Park — It opened in 1961 to commemorate the marriage of Emperor Akihito

Education
 operates public elementary and junior high schools. Kōjimachi Elementary School (千代田区立麹町小学校) is the zoned elementary school for Kokyo Gaien National Garden. There is a freedom of choice system for junior high schools in Chiyoda Ward, and so there are no specific junior high school zones.

References

External links

 Kōkyo-gaien Plaza at Lonely Planet

Chiyoda, Tokyo
Parks and gardens in Tokyo
Tokyo Imperial Palace